Skulskie Lake  is a lake in Gmina Skulsk, Konin County, Greater Poland Voivodeship, north-central Poland, near the village of Skulsk.

References

Lakes of Greater Poland Voivodeship
Konin County